is a species of flowering plant in the family Asteraceae that is endemic to the Kii Peninsula of Honshū, Japan.

Taxonomy
The specific epithet relates to the type locality in former Kii Province.

Distribution
Chrysanthemum kinokuniense occurs in coastal areas of the Kii Peninsula, in what is now Wakayama Prefecture and Mie Prefecture.

References

kinokuniense
Endemic flora of Japan
Plants described in 1935